is a Japanese/Hong Kongese anime adaptation of The Return of the Condor Heroes, a wuxia novel by Louis Cha.

Plot
The Legend of Condor Hero is set in the 13th century at the time of the Mongol invasion of China. Nearly a decade after the end of The Legend of the Condor Heroes, the Mongols have now conquered the Jin Dynasty and are now setting their sights towards the Southern Song Dynasty. The citizens of Southern Song, many of them great martial artists of the Central Plains, band together to defend their country from the onset of the Mongol horde. The story culminates in the historic Battle of Xiangyang, which was a critical battle that led to the fall of China to the Mongols.

The story revolves around the young martial arts fighter Yang Guo (Youka), who falls in love with his martial arts master, Xiaolongnü (Shouryuujo), and the trials and tribulations he goes through while searching for his love in war-torn China.

List of episodes
There are 78 episodes released of The Legend of Condor Hero. Season I is composed of two parts—episodes 1–12 and episodes 13–26. Season II takes after the end of Season I, starting from episode 27 to 52. Season III broadcast began in Taiwan and Canada in 2008.

The Japanese version was only made for the first series.

In all three series, Taiseng released the respective DVDs months before respective television broadcasts.

Theme songs
 Opening theme song (Japanese version): Yuu performed by NoR
 Opening theme song (Chinese version): True Love is Bitter performed by Andy Lau
 Ending theme song: Blása performed by Yae

Production
After Nippon Animation had obtained the rights of the series, it produced the animation version with association with Jade Animation (TVB's animation studio), and decided to split the series into 3 parts.

Video releases
Taiseng Entertainment released the first season for English-speaking audiences. Since the show was much more popular in Chinese-speaking nations than in Japan, the second season was not produced in Japanese like the first season, but in Cantonese and Mandarin.

VCD video of the series was released by Warner Bros. in Hong Kong.

External links
 
 The Legend of Condor Hero reviews on spcnet.tv
  The Legend of Condor Hero page on Nippon Animation website
  The Legend of Condor Hero page on TVB website

2001 anime television series debuts
Animated romance television series
Historical anime and manga
Japanese romance television series
Martial arts anime and manga
Animated television series about orphans
Television series set in the Mongol Empire
Television series set in the Southern Song
Television shows based on The Return of the Condor Heroes
Wuxia television series